The Bangladesh women's cricket team played the Pakistan women's cricket team in October and November 2019. The tour consisted of two Women's One Day Internationals (WODIs) and three Women's Twenty20 International (WT20I) matches, and all were played at the Gaddafi Stadium in Lahore. It was the first time that the Pakistan women's team played at the stadium. The Bangladesh women's team last toured Pakistan in September and October 2015.

The Bangladesh Cricket Board (BCB) opted not to send any of their Indian support staff, to avoid visa issues and political tensions between India and Pakistan. Less than two weeks from the start of the tour, the series was thrown into doubt, after the Bangladesh government had not yet given clearance for the team to travel. However, on 21 October 2019, the BCB confirmed the squads for the tour. The following day, the Pakistan Cricket Board (PCB) confirmed the itinerary for the tour.

Pakistan beat Bangladesh in the first two WT20I matches, to take an unassailable lead, and winning the series with one game left. Pakistan won the final WT20I by 28 runs, winning the series 3–0. In the WODI series, Pakistan won the first match by 29 runs. Bangladesh won the second match by one wicket, to level the series 1–1.

Squads

Labone Akther, Nahida Akter, Happy Alam, Sabinkun Nahar Jesmin, Fahima Khatun, Ritu Moni, Sobhana Mostary and Zinnat Asia Orthi were also named as standby players for Bangladesh.

WT20I series

1st WT20I

2nd WT20I

3rd WT20I

WODI series

1st WODI

2nd WODI

References

External links
 Series home at ESPN Cricinfo

2019 in women's cricket
2019 in Bangladeshi cricket
2019 in Pakistani cricket
International cricket competitions in 2019–20
Pakistan 2019-30
Bangladesh 2019-20
Women's international cricket tours of Pakistan
2019 in Bangladeshi women's sport
2019 in Pakistani women's sport